Ralph Compton (April 11, 1934 – September 16, 1998) was an American writer of western fiction.

A native of St. Clair County, Alabama, Compton stood six-foot-eight without his boots. He worked as a musician, a radio announcer, a songwriter, and a newspaper columnist. Mr. Compton began his writing career with a notable work, The Goodnight Trail, which was chosen as a finalist for the Western Writers of America "Medicine Pipe Bearer Award" bestowed upon the "Best Debut Novel". He was also the author of the Sundown Rider series and the Border Empire series. In the last decade of his life, he authored more than two dozen novels, some of which made it onto the USA Today bestseller list for fiction.

Ralph Compton died in Nashville, Tennessee at the age of 64. Since his death, Signet Books has continued the author's legacy, releasing new novels, written by authors such as Joseph A. West and David L. Robbins, under Compton's byline.

Novels 

 Autumn of the Gun
 Festival Of Spies
 Clarion's Call
 Devil's Canyon
 Navarro
 Bullet Creek
 Guns Of The Canyonlands
 By The Horns
 Rio Largo
 Deadwood Gulch
 The Killing Season
 Texas Empire
 The Bloody Trail
 Blood Duel
 Shadow Of The Gun
 Ride The Hard Trail
 Bullet For A Bad Man
 Outlaw's Reckoning
 Stryker's Revenge
 The Burning Range
 The Stranger From Abilene
 The Ghost Of Apache Creek
 Down On The Gila River
 Hard Ride To Wichita
 The Hunted
 Double-Cross Ranch

The Trail Drive Series 

 The Goodnight Trail
 The Western Trail
 The Chisholm Trail
 The California Trail
 The Shawnee Trail
 The Virginia City Trail
 The Dodge City Trail
 The Oregon Trail
 The Santa Fe Trail
 The Old Spanish Trail
 The Green River Trail
 The Deadwood Trail
 The Bandera Trail

Trail Drive books written by other authors under Compton's byline:

 The Dakota Trail by Robert Vaughan
 Bozeman Trail by Robert Vaughan
 The Alamosa Trail by Robert Vaughan
 The Abilene Trail by Dusty Richards
 Trail to Fort Smith by Dusty Richards
 The Palo Duro Trail by Jory Sherman
 The Ogallala Trail by Dusty Richards
 The Ellsworth Trail by Jory Sherman
 The Tenderfoot Trail by Joseph A West
 Trail To Cottonwood Falls by Dusty Richards
 The Amarillo Trail by Jory Sherman
 The Badlands Trail by Lyle Brandt
 The Saltwater Trail by Jackson Lowry

Trail of the Gunfighter 

 The Dawn of Fury
 The Killing Season
 Autumn of the Gun

Border Empire 

 The Border Empire
 Sixguns and Double Eagles
 Train To Durango

Sundown Riders 

 North to the Bitterroot
 Across the Rio Colorado
 The Winchester Run
 Devil's Canyon
 Whiskey River
 The Skeleton Lode
 Runaway Stage
 Do Or Die
 Bucked Out In Dodge
 West of Pecos

Sundown Riders books written by other authors under Compton's byline:

 Demon's Pass by Robert Vaughan
 The Trail's End by E.L. Ripley
 The Wolves of Seven Pines by E.L. Ripley
 Flames of Silver by Jackson Lowry
 Prairie Fire, Kansas by John Shirley
 Tin Star by Jackson Lowry
 Never Bet Against the Bullet by Jackson Lowry
 Calvert's Last Bluff by E.L. Ripley
 Seven Roads to vengeance by Carlton Stowers
 The Outlaw Hunters by D.B. Pulliam

Danny Duggin Series 

 Death Rides A Chestnut Mare
 The Shadow of a Noose
 Death Along the Cimmaron by Ralph Cotton
 Riders of Judgment by Ralph Cotton

Books written by other authors under Compton's byline 

The following novels were written by a variety of authors under Compton's byline and published by the Ralph Compton Estate (not including the Trail Drive Series or Sundown Riders Series, which are already listed above). In every one of these books, the first chapter is preceded by Compton's five-paragraph eulogy to "The Immortal Cowboy" which begins with: "This is respectfully dedicated to the 'American cowboy.' His was the saga sparked by the turmoil that followed the Civil War, and the passing of more than a century has by no means diminished the flame."

John Edward Ames:
 Deadwood Gulch

Ralph Cotton:
 The Shadow of a Noose

Marcus Galloway:
 One Man's Fire
 The Bloody Trail
 Straight Shooter
 Death of a Bad Man
 The Dangerous Man
 Brimstone Trail
 Rusted Tin
 Outlaw's Reckoning
 Straight to the Noose
 Hard Ride to Wichita
 Vigilante Dawn

Tony Healey:
 Blood on the Prairie (The Gunfighter Series)

Jackson Lowry:
 Lost Banshee Mine
 The Big Deal
 Shot to Hell (The Gunfighter Series)

Matthew P. Mayo:
 Tucker's Reckoning
 Deadman's Ranch
 Shotgun Charlie

Terrence McCauley:
 Ride the Hammer Down

Robert J. Randisi:
 The Wrong Side of the Law (The Gunfighter Series)
 Ride for Justice (The Gunfighter Series)

Dusty Richards
 North to the Salt Fork

David Robbins:
 For the Brand
 A Wolf in the Fold
 Brother's Keeper
 Texas Hills
 Fatal Justice
 The Law and the Lawless
 West of Pecos
 Bluff City
 Nowhere, TX
 The Evil Men do
 Bucked Out in Dodge

Jeff Rovin:
 Death Valley Drifter (The Gunfighter Series)
 Blood of the Hunters (The Gunfighter Series)

John Shirley:
 Broken Rider (The Gunfighter Series)

Carlton Stowers
 Comanche Trail
 Phantom Hill
 Dalton's Justice (The Gunfighter Series)
 Reunion in Hell (The Gunfighter Series)
 Return to Gila Bend (The Gunfighter Series)
 The Breckenridge Boys (The Gunfighter Series)

Robert Vaughan:
 The Dakota Trail

Joseph A. West:
 Bounty Hunter
 Rawhide Flat
 Showdown at Two-Bit Creek
 Doomsday Rider (The Buck Fletcher series)
 Vengeance Rider (The Buck Fletcher series)
 Slaughter Canyon
 Shadow of the Gun
 The Last Manhhunt
 The Man From Nowhere
 Blood on the Gallows
 The Convict Trail
 Blood and Gold
 West of the Law

References

External links

The Tennessee Writers Project Contains mini-biography + bibliography

1934 births
1998 deaths
People from St. Clair County, Alabama
Western (genre) writers
20th-century American novelists
American male novelists
20th-century American male writers